Alipur  is a village in Chanditala I community development block of Srirampore subdivision in Hooghly district in the Indian state of West Bengal.

Geography

Gram panchayat
Villages and census towns in Nababpur gram panchayat are: Alipur, Dudhkalmi, Nababpur and Pakur.

Demographics
As per 2011 Census of India, Alipur had a total population of 3,091 of which 1,585 (51%) were males and 1,506 (49%) were females. Population below 6 years was 302. The total number of literates in Alipur was 2,467 (88.45% of the population over 6 years).

References 

Villages in Chanditala I CD Block